Khori Bennett (born 13 December 1997) is a Jamaican footballer who plays as a forward for Charlotte Independence in the USL League One.

Early life
Bennett was born in Kingston, Jamaica and attended Wolmer's Boys School. With the Under-19 team in 2014, he scored 11 goals in nine games after winning back-to-back Under-19 knockout competition championships, back to back all island Under-16 championships, and one Under-14 all-island championship. Bennett won the O.G Brown Prize for Good Sportsmanship in 2014, led his team in scoring for three straight seasons from 2012 to 2014, and was named Team MVP in 2011 and 2013. He also played at youth level with both Harbour View and Real Mona.

College career
In 2015, Bennett moved to the United States to play college soccer at Northeastern University. In three seasons with the Huskies, Bennett made 44 appearances, scoring five goals and tallying three assists. For his senior year, Bennett transferred to Radford University, where he played a single season, scoring three goals in 15 appearances.

While at college, Bennett played in the USL PDL with Reading United AC. In four seasons at Reading, Bennett scored 11 regular season goals in 24 appearances. Including his goals in the playoffs and Lamar Hunt U.S. Open Cup, Bennett became Reading's all-time leading goalscorer.

Club career

Philadelphia Fury
In 2019, Bennett signed with NISA side Philadelphia Fury, playing a single game for the team before the club had to withdraw from the 2019 season and fold.

Cabezo de Torres
In late 2021, Bennett spent time with sixth-tier Spanish side CA Cabezo De Torres.

Charlotte Independence
In April 2022, after trialing with the club in preseason, Bennett signed with USL League One club Charlotte Independence. He made his debut for the club on 16 April 2022, starting in a 2–1 win over Northern Colorado Hailstorm. On August 1, 2022, Bennett was named USL League One Player of the Week for Week 18 of the 2022 season after scoring his first hat-trick against Central Valley Fuego FC.

References

1997 births
Living people
Association football forwards
Charlotte Independence players
Expatriate footballers in Spain
Expatriate soccer players in the United States
Jamaican expatriate footballers
Jamaican expatriate sportspeople in Spain
Jamaican expatriate sportspeople in the United States
Jamaican footballers
National Independent Soccer Association players
Northeastern Huskies men's soccer players
Philadelphia Fury players
Radford Highlanders men's soccer players
Reading United A.C. players
Sportspeople from Kingston, Jamaica
USL League One players
USL League Two players